The Kepong Komuter station (formerly Kepong railway station) is a Malaysian commuter train station located in the northern area of Kuala Lumpur along the Port Klang Line. The station is located along Jalan 32, Kepong Garden (Taman Kepong).

The Kepong Komuter station was built to cater increasing traffic in a suburban area with the similar name called Kepong. The Kepong Sentral Komuter station, which also serves the same locality, is located 1 km away.

As there are no other train systems that operate here other than KTM Komuter, this station can be packed at certain times. In 2013 a bigger car park was built to facilitate for the number of vehicles used by commuters but this faced some level of opposition from some residents living along Jalan 32 because the greenery had to be destroyed.

The main access roads to Kepong are Damansara-Puchong Expressway, Jalan Kuching, MRR II and Jalan Ipoh. RapidKL bus and Metro bus provides transport here.

External links
 Kepong KTM Komuter Station

Port Klang Line
Railway stations in Kuala Lumpur